Moniya is a small village in Visavadar Taluka, Junagadh District of Gujarat State, India.

About Moniya 
 

The village is led by an elected representative known as a Sarpanch.

Schools 
 Radhika Pra Shala Pvt: --> Moniya
 Moniya Pra Shala: --> Moniya
 S.R. Vasani School Of Management
 Shree Brahamanand Institute Of Computer Science : --> Chaparda, Visavadar

Transportation 
The nearest railway stations to Moniya are the Visavadar Rail Way Station and the Junichavand railway station.

Other stations and distance:
 Junichavand Rail Way Station - 2.5 km
 Visavadar Rail Way Station - 9 km
 Bilkha Rail Way Station - 13 km
 Satadhar Rail Way Station - 14 km

Nearest villages 
Sarsai (3 km), Chaparda (3 km), Chavand Juni (3 km), Leriya (4 km), Khambhaliya (5 km), Ravani (kuba) (6 km), Ishvariya Mandavad (6 km), Moti monapari (10 km), and Piyaava (9 km) are the nearest villages to Moniya. Moniya is surrounded by Bhesan Taluka towards North, Bagasara Taluka towards East, Mendarda Taluka towards west, Junagadh Taluka towards west.

Taluka near Moniya

District, cities and tourism near Moniya

Airport Near By Moniya

See also
 Sarsai (Near By Moniya)
 Visavadar
 Somnath
 veraval Gujarat

References

Villages in Junagadh district